The Dharawal language, also spelt Tharawal and Thurawal, and also known as Wodiwodi and other variants, is an Australian Aboriginal language of New South Wales.

Phonology

Consonants

Vowels 
Vowels are phonemically /a i u/.

See also
 Tharawal
 Wodiwodi

References

External links 
 Bibliography of Tharawal people and language resources, at the Australian Institute of Aboriginal and Torres Strait Islander Studies 

Tharawal languages
Extinct languages of New South Wales
Critically endangered languages